Canadian mining in Latin America and the Caribbean began in the 20th century. Latin America and the Caribbean's vast resources give the region great geopolitical importance, attracting foreign interest for centuries. From the colonial race of European empires, to the multinationals of today's neoliberal capitalist world, this region continues to draw interest. Canada's involvement in Latin America increased dramatically since 1989 with several landmark negotiations and agreements. By 2009, the Canadian larger-company mineral exploration market in this region was valued at US$1.7 billion.

Currently, Latin America and the Caribbean are dominated by Canadian companies falling from a 49% to 32% held control over the larger-company mineral exploration market after the global recession of 2008. The Canadian share of the market is roughly US$59 million more than the amount domestic companies planned to spend in this region. Both Mexico and Chile have the most intense focus of Canadian mining companies; however, their interest and involvement in other Latin American countries is prevalent.

Negotiations and agreements in Latin America

Central America and the Caribbean

Free Trade Agreements (FTAs) 
Canada-Panama Free Trade Agreement  Signed: 14 May 2010
Canada - Costa Rica Free Trade Agreement  Brought into force: 1 November 2002

Ongoing FTA negotiations 
Canada - Caribbean Community Free Trade Negotiations (CARICOM)
Canada - Central America Four (CA4)
Canada - Dominican Republic Free Trade Agreement Negotiations
Canada - Honduras Free Trade Negotiations
Free Trade Area of the Americas (FTAA)
Negotiations to Modernize the Canada-Costa Rica Free Trade Agreement

Foreign Investment Promotion and Protection (FIPAs) 
Canada - Costa Rica Foreign Investment Promotion and Protection (FIPA) Date: 29 September 1999
Canada - El Salvador Foreign Investment Promotion and Protection (FIPA) Date: 31 May 1999
Canada - Panama Foreign Investment Promotion and Protection (FIPA) Date: 13 February 1998
Canada - Barbados Foreign Investment Promotion and Protection (FIPA) Date: 17 January 1997
Canada - Trinidad and Tobago Foreign Investment Promotion and Protection (FIPA) Date: 8 July 1996

Other types of agreements and initiatives 
Central America Memorandum of Understanding on Trade and Investment (MOUTI) Date: 18 March 1998

South America (with Andean Community)

Free Trade Agreements (FTAs) 
Canada - Colombia Free Trade Agreement  Date: 15 August 2011
Canada - Peru Free Trade Agreement  Date: 1 August 2009
Canada - Chile Free Trade Agreement  Date: 5 July 1997

Ongoing FTA negotiations 
Canada - Andean Community Countries Free Trade Discussions
Free Trade Area of the Americas (FTAA)

Foreign Investment Promotion and Protection (FIPAs) 
Canada - Peru Foreign Investment Promotion and Protection (FIPA) Date: 20 June 2007
Canada - Uruguay Foreign Investment Promotion and Protection (FIPA) Date: 2 June 1999
Canada - Venezuela Foreign Investment Promotion and Protection (FIPA) Date: 28 January 1998
Canada - Ecuador Foreign Investment Promotion and Protection (FIPA) Date: 6 June 1997
Canada - Argentina Foreign Investment Promotion and Protection (FIPA) Date: 29 April 1993

Other types of agreements and initiatives 
Andean Community Trade and Investment Cooperation Arrangement (TICA) Date: 31 May 1999
Southern Cone Common Market (MERCOSUR) Trade and Investment Cooperation Arrangements (TICA) Date: 16 June 1998

Neo-liberal capitalism 
The Canadian governments involvement and the penetration of Canadian capital in the region reflected the neoliberal movement of the 1980s and 1990s. Much of the Latin American economy was dominated by World Bank and IMF forced policies during the debt crisis of the early 1980s. The late 1990s began a shift in political thought in the region moving towards support for more populist, left and centre-left governments, particularly by peasants. Mercosur, an economic agreement between Argentina, Brazil, Paraguay and Uruguay along with associate members Chile and Bolivia in 1994 want to improve development through protecting the free movement of goods between these countries.  Such policies as establishing a common external tariff and a common trade policy promote an infant industry argument. The relaunching of Mercosur in the mid 2000s can be seen as a new form of regionalist governance in the Southern Cone. Canada has become at the centre of this conflict and has received much criticism by anti-imperialist struggles protesting for local control over privatized natural resources.

Foreign aid policy shift 
Recently, with the Conservative government of Canada, a dramatic shift in foreign aid has occurred towards middle-income countries in Latin America, causing the abandonment of many projects in Africa. Once again, the Conservative government has come under scrutiny for its Foreign Aid Policy as the Canadian International Development Agency has established foreign-aid pilot projects in South America with large mining corporations, to foster economic growth and international trade in Canada. Since the Conservatives came to power in 2006, over $50 million in projects have been approved and many more are under way. NGOs and mining industry critics have been accusing the Conservative government for subsidizing phony "corporate social responsibility" projects that are led by profitable companies with bad intentions. Jamie Kneen of MiningWatch Canada said that "the government is helping the mining industry to put a positive spin on their operations, despite their negative environmental and human-rights records". In contrast, the president of the Canadian Mining Association Pierre Gratton believes "these projects help improve the image of the industry ... because they are meaningful and have value. This is not just PR."

Cultural, health and environmental concerns 
The expansion of Canadian mining companies in Latin America and the Caribbean during the 1990s was never paralleled with official Canadian legislation on standards abroad, which has caused much debate on socio-economic change and conflict to numerous rural and indigenous communities. Traditional production methods are often destroyed, and in regions such as Chile, areas with mining activities have the greatest unemployment and poverty rates in the country. Mining can have adverse effects on non-mineral production, such as agriculture when Canadian mining production leads to soil erosion, such as the case in La Libertad, Colombia. In addition, reports of the spills of harmful chemicals, such as cyanide in local water supplies has increased deaths of livestock and skin disorders and infection among children.  Increased social disorganization with violent protests, criminal activities and even deaths and group rape have been suspected to be caused by the involvement of some Canadian mining companies. Increased assassinations of activists have shown the political conflicts and related corruption as divisions between anti and pro-mining groups escalate.

Canadian companies

Ascendant Copper

Involvement in Ecuador 
 Protests over the Junín mining project

Barrick Gold 
Toronto-based Barrick Gold Corp, the largest gold producer in the world, has been critiqued by NGOs such as the MiningWatch Canada, Greenpeace, and Amnesty International for their environmental degradation and economic and social impacts in Ancash, Condorhuain, Chilecito, Famatina, and Pascua-Lama.

Involvement in Argentina and Chile 
(see Greenpeace Protests)

Since Barrick Gold Corp acquired the Pascua Lama open-pit mine site in 1994 which crosses the borders of Argentina and Chile, environmental concerns such as water pollution and glacier relocation.  Protesters carrying sign such as "Harper Go Home!" were displayed upon Prime Minister Stephen Harper's visit in July 2007 and show the growing negative opinion of Canadian relations by Latin Americans.

Involvement in Peru

Conquistador Mines Ltd

Involvement in Colombia 
Bolivar community protests and conflict

Colombia Goldfields and B2Gold

Involvement in Colombia 
Caldas and Antioquia community protests

Da Capo Resources (today Vista Gold Corporation) 
Bolivia - Masacre de Navidad Bolivian mines of Amayapamp and Capasirca 1996

Goldcorp Inc.

Involvement in Guatemala 
The indigenous communities of Guatemala have been rife in protest due to the activities of Goldcorp. In a particular case the Maya-Mam in San Miguel Ixtahuacán have experienced an increase in violence, particularly during an event where the government unleashed security forces killing one man and seriously wounding 16 people. Environmental problems such as deforestation through the clear cutting of 20 square km of forest, the contamination of ground and surface water with the excessive use of cyanide and the extensive draining of water. The contamination of water with arsenic, magnesium, cyanide cooper and iron in San Marcos exceeds the already low regulations on water quality in Guatemala. Damage to the structure of homes is increasingly common due to dynamite explosions. Increased skin and respiratory diseases are also a major issue. The Guatemala government suspended operations of the Canadian Goldcorp's Marlin Mine after the demands of the 18 Maya Indigenous communities affected by the environmental degradation of land. Reports from the Latin American Water Tribunal, the International Labour Organization, the Physicians for Human Rights and the University of Michigan have all negative reports on the mining site, which have been dismissed by Goldcorp and the Canadian government.

Involvement in Honduras 
Findings of dangerously high levels of heavy metal poisoning in the blood of children and adults according to World Health Organization and CDC standards in the Siria Valley due to open-pit, cyanide leaching. In 2008 Goldcorp halted operations at the San Martin mine. Canadian government and business such as Aura Minerals still cooperate with the Honduran regime with further investments in corrupt mining practices and low-paid sweatshop industry. Reports of death squad killings in Honduras due to mining activities in general have also occurred.

Greystar Resources

Colombia 
Santander community protests and conflict

HudBay Minerals Inc.

Involvement in Guatemala 

Lawsuits against the company have been launched by a group of 11 women from Guatemala with allegations of gang-rape by security personnel, members of the police and military in 2007 after an attempt to clear people from lands near a mining project. In addition a lawsuit for the murder of a man by private security guards hired by HudBays Guatemalan subsidiary company in 2009 was also put forth in Ontario courts. The brutal murder of an indigenous rural worker and the resulting wounding of seven others by a subsidiary of HudBay Minerals Inc. occurred in 2009 after locals gathered to protest a forced eviction were reported by Amnesty International and other Human rights groups.

Manhattan Minerals Corp

Peru 
Tambogrande community protests

Metallica Resources Inc

Mexico 
community of Cerro de San Pedro protests

Skye Resources

Guatemala 
Mayan K'iche' peasants protests

South American Silver Corporation

Bolivia 
On 11 July 2012, Bolivian president Evo Morales revoked SASC's mining permit by presidential decree.

Bill C-300 
The Corporate Accountability of Mining, Oil and Gas Corporations in Developing Countries Act, also known as Bill C-300, was defeated in a vote of 140 to 134 in the House of Commons of Canada in October 2010. The Summary of the bill states:

Mining companies were extremely opposed to the legislation and believed the bill would cost jobs.  For example, a mining executive complained that the bill assumed "Canadian mining companies are bad corporate citizens". He insisted that this "could not be further from the truth". An article written by faculty of law professors from both the University of Toronto and Ottawa in the Canadian Globe and Mail argued if standards are being met then the extreme opposition towards Bill C-311 should not have occurred by mining companies.

Greenpeace protests 
In March 2011, Greenpeace Argentina led a campaign against Canadian mining giant Barrick Gold in its attempts to block the application of a new law to protect glaciers passed by parliament in Argentina. The law prohibits any poor environmental standards which would damage and contaminate glaciers.

Accumulation by dispossession 
David Harvey's idea of accumulation by dispossession is a framework used by some sociologists, economists and geographers to understand the activities of Canadian mining companies in Latin America. This idea views that western countries use neoliberal capitalist policies to ensure their wealth and influence by dispossessing the public of their wealth or land. This concept sees the constant need to pursue accumulation of wealth to ensure the current economic model as harmful to the environment and societies.

See also 
Canadian Mining in the Democratic Republic of the Congo
Mining Companies of Canada

References 

Mining in South America
Mining in Central America
Foreign relations of Canada by region
Politics of South America
Politics of the Caribbean
Politics of Central America
Economy of the Caribbean
Latin America and the Caribbean